The 1957 Italian Athletics Championships was the 47th edition of the Italian Athletics Championships and were held in Bologna (main event) from 13 to 15 September.

Champions

This year was the first time of the women's 400 metres.

Full results.

References

External links
 Italian Athletics Federation

Italian Athletics Championships
Athletics
Italian Athletics Outdoor Championships
Athletics competitions in Italy